Dewdrop Glacier is a small hanging glacier at the head of the Devils Punchbowl between The Flatiron and Devils Ridge, at the southwest side of Granite Harbour, in Victoria Land. It was charted by the British Antarctic Expedition, 1910–13, under Robert Falcon Scott, and named for its suggestive appearance, hanging on the edge of the Devils Punchbowl.

References 

Glaciers of Victoria Land
Scott Coast